Skaista Parish is an administrative unit of Krāslava Municipality, Latvia.

External links

Parishes of Latvia
Krāslava Municipality